Segetibacter koreensis is a Gram-negative, strictly aerobic, heterotrophic, non-spore-forming and non-motile bacterium from the genus of Segetibacter which has been isolated from soil from a ginseng field from Pocheon in Korea.

References

Chitinophagia
Bacteria described in 2007